Tired of Tomorrow is the second studio album by American shoegaze band Nothing. It was released on May 13, 2016, by Relapse Records. It is the first Nothing album to feature bassist Nick Bassett, the guitarist of Whirr.

Critical reception

Brandon Stosuy of Pitchfork praised the album's "invitingly deep sound", describing it as "familiar but new; varied but consistent; full of ambience but sturdy".

Tired of Tomorrow placed at number 40 on Rough Trade's Albums of the Year list for 2016. Pitchfork ranked it at number 48 on its list of "The 50 Best Shoegaze Albums of All Time".

Track listing

Personnel
Tired of Tomorrow album personnel adapted from LP liner notes.

Nothing
 Domenic Palermo – vocals, guitar, string arrangements, production, design
 Brandon Setta – vocals, guitar, production
 Nick Bassett – bass, piano
 Kyle Kimball – drums

Additional musicians
 Shelly Weiss – cello, violin, string arrangements
 Kylie Lotz – vocals

Technical
 Will Yip – producer, mixing, engineering at Studio 4 Recordings
 Ryan Smith – mastering
 Jaime Wong – assistant engineer
 Daniel Feiphery – design, photography

Charts

References

External links
 Official website
 Relapse Records store

2016 albums
Relapse Records albums
Nothing (band) albums
Albums produced by Will Yip